Brlog is a small remote settlement in the Municipality of Sodražica in Slovenia. A small part of the settlement lies in the neighboring Municipality of Velike Lašče. The area is part of the traditional region of Lower Carniola and is now included in the Southeast Slovenia Statistical Region.

Name
The official Slovenian name of the settlement, Brlog - del, literally means 'part of Brlog'. The part of the settlement in the neighboring Municipality of Velike Lašče is named identically.

References

External links
Brlog on Geopedia

Populated places in the Municipality of Velike Lašče